The 5th NKP Salve Challenger Trophy was an Indian domestic cricket tournament that was held in Ahmedabad from 15 October to 18 October 1998. The series involved the domestic and national players from India allocated in India Seniors, India A, and India B.

Due to cyclone all the matches were washed out due to rain except for the first match played between India Seniors and India A.

No play was possible on the final day, and India A shared the trophy with India B, both getting declared as joint winners.

Squads

 Initially, Mohammad Azharuddin was selected to captain India Seniors, but he opted out of the tournament for personal reasons. Nayan Mongia was named as captain of the side, and JP Yadav was included in the squad as his replacement.

Points Table

Matches

Group stage

Final

References

Indian domestic cricket competitions